Gunnar Nielsen may refer to:

 Gunnar Nielsen (actor) (1919–2009), Swedish film actor
 Gunnar Nielsen (athlete) (1928–1985), Danish athlete, former world record holder over 1500 metres
 Gunnar Guillermo Nielsen (born 1983), football player, currently playing for FC Fredericia
 Gunnar Nielsen (footballer) (born 1986), Faroe Islands footballer

See also
 Gunnar Nilsson (disambiguation)
 Gunnar Nelson (disambiguation)